Skate Depot was a skating rink in Cerritos, California, United States. The rink closed in 2014.

The rink is featured in the HBO documentary film United Skates.

References

2014 disestablishments in California
Cerritos, California
Roller skating rinks